Trimethylpentane may refer to:
 2,2,3-Trimethylpentane
 2,2,4-Trimethylpentane
 2,3,3-Trimethylpentane
 2,3,4-Trimethylpentane